Quetta is the tenth most populous city in Pakistan with a population of over 1.1 million. It is situated in south-west of the country close to the International border with Afghanistan. It is the capital of the province of Balochistan where it is the largest city. The city is known as the "Fruit Garden of Pakistan" due to the numerous fruit orchards in and around it, and the large variety of fruits and dried fruit products produced there.

Located in northern Balochistan near the Pakistan-Afghanistan border and the road across to Kandahar, Quetta is a trade and communication centre between the two countries. The city is near the Bolan Pass route which was once one of the major gateways from Central Asia to South Asia. Quetta played an important role militarily for the Pakistani Armed Forces in the intermittent Afghanistan conflict. It is currently home to 500,000 undocumented Afghan refugees.

Etymology 
The name Quetta is a variation of the Pashto word Kwatkōṭ, or kōta meaning "fortress". Quetta was formerly known as Shalkot,

History 

The immediate area has long been one of pastures and mountains, with varied plants and animals relative to the dry plains to the west.

From 11th century, the land of Quetta was owned and ruled by the Kasi Pashtun tribe. It was captured by Sultan Mahmud Ghaznavi during his invasion of South Asia. In 1543, Mughal emperor Humayun came to Quetta en route to Safavid Persia, leaving his son and future Mughal emperor Akbar here. In 1709, the region was a part of Afghan Hotak dynasty and stayed a part until 1747 when Ahmed Shah Durrani conquered it and made it a part of Durrani Empire. The first European visited Quetta in 1828, describing it as mud-walled fort surrounded by three hundred mud houses.

In 1876 Quetta was occupied by the British and subsequently incorporated into British India. In 1856, British General John Jacob had urged his government to occupy Quetta given its strategic position on the western frontier. British Troops constructed the infrastructure for their establishment.

By the time of the earthquake on 31 May 1935, Quetta had developed into a bustling city with a number of multi-storey buildings and so was known as "Little London". The epicenter of the earthquake was close to the city and destroyed most of the city's infrastructure, killing an estimated 40,000 people.

Geography

Climate 

Quetta has a cold semi-arid climate (Köppen BSk) with a significant variation between summer and winter temperatures. Autumn starts in mid-September and continues until mid-November with average temperatures in the  range. Winter starts in late November and ends in late February, with average temperatures near . Unlike more easterly parts of Pakistan, Quetta does not have a monsoon season of heavy rainfall. In the winter, snowfall has become quite erratic (December, January and February).

The city saw a severe drought from 1999 to 2001, during which the city did not receive snowfall and below normal rains. In 2002 the city received snow after a gap of five years. In 2004 and 2005, the city received normal rains after three years without snowfall while in 2006, 2007 and 2009 the city received no snow. During the winter of 2010 it received no snow and saw below normal rains due to the presence of El-Nino over Pakistan.

Demographics 

The population of the city is around one million. In 2016, it was estimated at 1,140,000, but the 2017 Census revealed a total of 1,001,205. This makes it the largest city in Balochistan province and one of the major cities of Pakistan. The scholars disagree about the demographics of the city. According to some, the city has a Pashtun plurality followed by Baloch people, other indigenous people of Balochistan, Hazaras and lastly the settlers from other areas of Pakistan. Others think the city has a Pashtun majority followed by Balochs, Hazaras, Brahui, Punjabis and Muhajir people. Urdu being the national language is used and understood by all the residents and serves as a lingua franca.

According to Reuters and the BBC, there are as many as 500,000-600,000 Hazaras living in Quetta and its surrounding areas.

Administration 
At the local level, the city is governed by a municipal corporation consisting of 66 ward members which elects a mayor and a deputy mayor. In addition, Quetta development authority is responsible for provision of municipal services for the city.

Transportation 
Quetta is on the western side of Pakistan and is connected to the rest of the country by a network of roads, railways and its international airport close to its center.

Pakistan International Airlines has regular flights to and from the other major cities of Pakistan including Islamabad, Gwadar, Karachi, Lahore and Peshawar.

The railway track was laid in the 1890s during the British era to link Quetta with rest of the country. The extensive network of Pakistan Railways connects Quetta to Karachi in the south, by a  track, Lahore in the northeast (1,170 km or 727 miles) and Peshawar further northeast (1,587 km or 986 miles). A metalled road runs alongside the railway that connects Quetta to Karachi via the nearby town of Sibi to Jacobabad and Rohri in the plain of the River Indus.

Education 
Quetta serves as the learning centre for the Balochistan province. The city has a number of government and private colleges, including the following:
 University of Balochistan
 Balochistan University of Information Technology, Engineering and Management Sciences (BUITEMS) 
 Sardar Bahadur Khan Women's University
 Islamia High School: It was frequently visited by Quaid-e-Azam in 1937 and was nicknamed as Chhota Aligarh (Little Aligarh) by him
 St. Joseph's Convent School, Quetta
 Bolan Medical College
 University Law College (ULC)
 Balochistan Agriculture College
 Tameer-e-Nau Public College
 St Francis Grammar School
 Pakistan Command and Staff College
 Science College
 OPF Public School
 School of Infantry and Tactics
 Quetta Institute of Medical Sciences

Media

Television 
Mechid TV

Sports 
Football is the most popular sport among the people of Quetta. Football clubs from Quetta include: Quetta Zorawar, Muslim FC, Balochistan United W.F.C., Hazara Green Football Club, Baluch Football Club and Quetta Bazigars Club. Balochistan United W.F.C. won the 2014 National Women Championship.

Bugti Stadium is the home of Balochistan cricket team, a first-class cricket team which competes in domestic tournaments, and the Quetta based team Quetta Gladiators compete in the Pakistan Super League (PSL). They were the champion of the PSL 2019.

Boxing is highly popular as well. Muhammad Waseem is a professional boxer from Quetta. In Body Building Nisar Ahmed Khilji has Mr. Balochistan and Mr. Pakistan Titles and Pakistan representation in International Body Building Contests. In hockey, Quetta has produced Zeeshan Ashraf and Shakeel Abbasi, who were members of the Pakistan's national hockey team.

Facilities 

The Shaheed Nauoroz Stadium is the largest stadium in the city. The city also has Ayub National Stadium, a multipurpose stadium used for football and cricket and Bugti Stadium for cricket.

Local facilities were created in the city for mountain climbing and caving as well as water sports. Hayatullah Khan Durrani (Pride of Performance) is the chief executive of Hayat Durrani Water Sports Academy, Balochistan's first and only Rowing, Canoeing, Kayaking, Sailing, rough swimming and boating academy where all such facilities provide free to the youth members at Hanna Lake.

Villages 
 
 
 Kali, Hajika, 190 km south from Quetta

Twin towns and sister cities

See also 
 2008 Ziarat earthquake
 List of people from Quetta
 Balochi cuisine
 Quetta hut

Notes

References

Bibliography

External links 

 Balochistan Board 
  (archived 18 October 2010)

 
Capitals of Pakistan
Cities destroyed by earthquakes
Populated places in Balochistan, Pakistan
Metropolitan areas of Pakistan